Sheikh Suleiman al-Taji al-Faruqi (1882 - 1958), called by some people "the Maari of Palestine" (معري فلسطين). He was a Palestinian politician, writer and poet, and one of the founders of the Ottoman National Party in 1911, and the founder of the newspaper "The Islamic University" in 1933. He was known for his strong opposition to the leadership of Hajj Muhammad Amin al-Husseini.

Early life 
Suleiman Abdul Majeed Al-Taji Al-Farouqi was born in Ramla, Palestine, in 1882, and his father is Abdul Majeed Al-Taji. Sources mention his brother Shukri, and that Suleiman had a son named Harith. He received his primary education at the hands of Sheikh Yusuf al-Khairy, and some sources mention that Suleiman had lost his sight at the age of nine. His father later sent him to Al-Azhar Mosque to learn the sciences of jurisprudence, language and history, and he was taught by Sheikh Muhammad Abduh, and the sources mentioned that Suleiman “drew Sheikh Muhammad Abd for his intelligence and speed of assimilation.” He spent 9 years at Al-Azhar, then returned to Palestine, and later left for Istanbul, where he obtained a degree in law in 1909, and mastered the Ottoman Turkish, French and English languages, and he used to sit to interpret the Qur’an in the Hagia Sophia Mosque.

He returned to Palestine during the First World War, and wrote several articles in the Palestine newspaper in 1911, and his article entitled “The Danger of Zionism” was a reason for censoring the newspaper, as he wrote “You must first be patriotic and secondly loyal to the Ottomans,” and criticized the authorities for their indulgence towards the immigration of Jews to Palestine. He founded the "Ottoman National Party" in 1911, but Jamal Pasha deported him to Konya with his brother Shukri because of their opposition to the seizure of crops to supply the army. Solomon wrote several poems, including the poem “The First Plane Falls Over Jaffa,” which he wrote in 1912 when the first Ottoman plane crashed over the shore of Jaffa. Solomon later went to Egypt and joined the French Institute of Law and obtained a doctorate in law there in 1919.

Mandatory Palestine
He returned to Palestine again after the First World War, where he worked in the legal profession. At the end of 1920, Suleiman published an article calling for the holding of a "Palestinian national conference," and he was one of the participants in the Third Arab Palestinian Conference that was held in Haifa from December 13–19, 1920, and was elected as a member of the committee. The Arab executive that emerged from that conference. He also participated in the work of the Fifth Palestinian Arab Congress, which was held in Nablus between August 20 and September 1, 1922. Suleiman was also a key figure in the opposition movement led by Haji Muhammad Amin al-Husseini.

Suleiman delivered the speech of the Palestinian delegation that met with the British Colonial Minister Leo Amery in April 1925, as he was a representative of the opposition movement when the minister visited Jerusalem. In July 1926, Suleiman invited the leaders of Palestine to hold the Seventh Palestinian Arab Conference, and a preparatory committee of 40 members was subsequently formed, and Solomon was one of the participants in it in June 1928. Solomon participated in the conference of the Palestinian Islamic Nation, which was held on 11 November. December 1931 at the King David Hotel in Jerusalem, and the purpose of its holding was to confront the General Islamic Conference called for by Hajj Amin al-Husseini.

On May 18, 1933, he published the daily newspaper "The Islamic University", which covered political, scientific, and literary topics, and revealing the Zionist ambitions in Palestine, where he defined it as "Palestinian of origin, Islamic doctrine, Eastern al-Manzaa", but in 1938 the British Mandatory authorities withdrew its license it and it stopped publication.

Later life
Suleiman immigrated to Jordan after the Nakba in 1948, and went to the town of Sweileh, then moved to Zarqa and finally settled in the city of Jericho, where he re-issued his newspaper "The Islamic University" and explained the causes of the Nakba. The first issue was published on March 15, 1949, but officials later shut it down. He presided over the Amman Conference in October 1948, and then participated in the Jericho Conference in December 1948, in which King Abdullah I bin Al-Hussein was acknowledged as ruler, and in which he agreed to annex the West Bank of the Jordan River to the Hashemite Kingdom of Jordan. On September 1, 1951, Suleiman was appointed to the Jordanian Senate.

Suleiman bin Saleh Al-Kharashi mentioned in his book “Celebrities and Prisons”: “And (for the illiterate of Palestine) Sheikh Suleiman al-Taji al-Faruqi's are wonderful poems both before and after his exile to Anatolia.

Death 
Suleiman did not stay for long in the Senate, as he died in Jericho in 1958 AD corresponding to 1378 AH at the age of 76, and was buried in the Bab al-Rahma cemetery east of Lions' Gate in Jerusalem.

References 

Palestinian poets
Palestinian politicians
1882 births
1958 deaths